The Royal Connaught Boat Club (RCBC) was founded in 1868 in Pune, India.  It is located on Boat Club Road.

The club provides facilities for water sports, including rowing, with a boathouse and slipway down to the southern side of the Mula-Mutha River, just below the confluence of the Mula River and the Mutha River.

See also
 Rowing Federation of India

References

External links 
 Royal Connaught Boat Club website

Sports clubs established in 1868
1868 establishments in India
Rowing clubs in India
Sports venues in Pune
Sport in Pune